Martin McNulty Crane (D) (November 17, 1853 – August 3, 1943) was an influential Texas Granger movement and Populist politician. The son of Martin Crane and Mary née McNulty, the younger Martin was born in West Virginia. His mother died when he was aged four years. During the ensuing year before his father also died, young Martin first moved with his father to Kentucky and, then, to Tennessee. Completely orphaned by 5 years old, Martin McNulty Crane was raised by various family friends in Tennessee until at age 17 he emigrated from Tennessee to Texas, where he worked at various occupations and read law. He was admitted to the Texas bar in 1877. Within a year thereafter, he was elected a prosecuting attorney and reelected to the same office in 1880.

Politically, Crane sympathized with the beleaguered North Texas farmers. In 1884, he was elected to the Nineteenth State Legislature and supported programs put forth by the Farmer’s Alliance. In 1890, Crane was elected to the Texas State Senate. In 1892, he was elected Lieutenant Governor of Texas. In 1894, he resigned this office to successfully seek election as Texas Attorney General. He further distinguished himself over the next four years, by as Attorney General, successfully, arguing a number of precedent-setting antitrust cases. During his legislative, executive and prosecutorial career, he sought to curb the then unregulated powers of the railroads, oil companies and mercantile banks, which were anathema to the interests of Texas farmers. He was a staunch supporter of the reform efforts of Texas governors James S. Hogg and Charles A. Culberson. In 1917, Crane served as the chief prosecuting counsel for the successful impeachment of Texas Governor James E. Ferguson. In the 1920s, Crane headed the Dallas County Citizens League, which had been established to oppose the growing political influence of the Ku Klux Klan. Crane died in 1943 at age 88, after a short illness.

One of Crane's descendants is the indie folk singer-songwriter Martin McNulty Crane, the frontman of the band Brazos.

References

External links
http://www.tshaonline.org/handbook/online/articles/fcr04

Lieutenant Governors of Texas
Texas Attorneys General
Democratic Party members of the Texas House of Representatives
1855 births
1943 deaths